Blant is a French and English surname. Notable people with the surname include:

 Colin Blant, English footballer
 Julien Le Blant, French painter
 Edmond-Frédéric Le Blant, French archaeologist and historian

Other 
 Blant Fjell

See also 
 Blantyre (disambiguation)

English-language surnames